The 1999 NAIA Division II men's basketball tournament  was the tournament held by the NAIA to determine the national champion of men's college basketball among its Division II members in the United States and Canada for the 1998–99 basketball season.

Top-seeded Cornerstone defeated  two-time defending champions Bethel (IN) in the championship game, 113–109 after one overtime period, to claim the Golden Eagles' first NAIA national title.

The tournament was played at the Idaho Center at Northwest Nazarene University in Nampa, Idaho.

Qualification

The tournament field remained fixed at thirty-two teams, and the top sixteen teams were seeded.

The tournament continued to utilize a single-elimination format.

Bracket

See also
1999 NAIA Division I men's basketball tournament
1999 NCAA Division I men's basketball tournament
1999 NCAA Division II men's basketball tournament
1999 NCAA Division III men's basketball tournament
1999 NAIA Division II women's basketball tournament

References

NAIA
NAIA Men's Basketball Championship
1999 in sports in Idaho